NRP Dom Carlos I (A522) is the lead ship of the Portuguese Navy's Dom Carlos I-class survey vessels (ex-US s) adapted in Portugal for the execution of hydrography and oceanography surveys. Before the transference to the Portuguese Navy, Dom Carlos I was USNS Audacious (T-AGOS-11) surveillance ship of the United States Navy.

History
USNS Audacious was a Stalwart-class modified tactical auxiliary general ocean surveillance ship of the United States Navy.

Stalwart-class ships were originally designed to collect underwater acoustical data in support of Cold War anti-submarine warfare operations in the 1980s.

ex-USNS Audacious was transferred to the Portuguese Navy in 1996 and renamed Dom Carlos I in honor to Carlos I, King of Portugal and a pioneer scientist in the oceanography field. The refitting of Audacious for transfer to Portugal was completed at Detyens Shipyard on the site of the former Charleston Naval Base in North Charleston, South Carolina.

In Portugal, Almirante Gago Coutinho underwent adaptation works towards its transformation into a hydro-oceanographic ship, in the Alfeite Naval Arsenal. The first phase of the transformation was carried out in 2001 and the second phase in 2004. The Portuguese Navy has tried to fix it for almost a year but that work is very difficult because of lack of money and resources and tight budget.  In its full capacity for the assignments it was tasked for; this vessel stands over 6 months in service without refueling. The only reason it needs harbouring is to get the food needed for its 32 sailors on board.

Recently it was installed a new sonar dome. With this new improvement it is expected to sonar the 5,000 meter depth or more.

References

External links

NavSource
 

Stalwart-class ocean surveillance ships
Cold War auxiliary ships of the United States
Ships built by Tacoma Boatbuilding Company
1989 ships
Ships transferred from the United States Navy to the Portuguese Navy